Víctor Lidio Jara Martínez (28 September 1932 – 16 September 1973) was a Chilean teacher, theater director, poet, singer-songwriter and Communist political activist. He developed Chilean theater by directing a broad array of works, ranging from locally produced plays to world classics, as well as the experimental work of playwrights such as Ann Jellicoe. He also played a pivotal role among neo-folkloric musicians who established the Nueva canción chilena (New Chilean Song) movement. This led to an uprising of new sounds in popular music during the administration of President Salvador Allende.

Jara was arrested by the Chilean military shortly after the 11 September 1973 coup led by Augusto Pinochet, which overthrew Allende. He was tortured during interrogations and ultimately shot dead, and his body was thrown out on the street of a shantytown in Santiago. The contrast between the themes of his songs—which focused on love, peace, and social justice—and his murder transformed Jara into a "potent symbol of struggle for human rights and justice" for those killed during the Pinochet regime. His prominent role as an admirer and propagandist for Che Guevara and Allende's government, in which he served as a cultural ambassador through the late 1960s and until the 1973, made him a target.

In June 2016, a Florida jury found former Chilean Army officer Pedro Barrientos liable for Jara's murder. In July 2018, eight retired Chilean military officers were sentenced to 15 years and a day in prison for Jara's murder.

Early life

Víctor Lidio Jara Martinez was born on 28 September 1932. His parents were tenant farmers who lived near the town of La Quiriquina, located twelve kilometers from Chillán Viejo; he had five brothers. His exact place of birth is uncertain, but he was born in the Ñuble Region. At the age of five, his family moved to Lonquén, a town near Santiago de Chile, where his father, Manuel Jara, had rented a small parcel of land. His father was illiterate and did not want his children going to school, so that they could help him in the fields instead. His mother, on the other hand, knew how to read a little and from the beginning she insisted that they at least learn the alphabet.

Jara's mother was a mestiza with Araucanian ancestry from southern Chile, who had taught herself to play the guitar and piano. She also performed as a singer, with a repertory of traditional folk songs that she used for local events like weddings and funerals. The relationship between her parents became more tense with each passing day, her father began to drink and disappeared from the house several days in a row, leaving all the work in the hands of Amanda. Later, her mother moved to Santiago and took a job as a cook in a restaurant in Vega Poniente. Because she was so skilled she did well there and so she was able to educate three of her children, including Victor. 

She died when Jara was 15. Jara began to study accounting, but soon moved into a seminary, where he studied for the priesthood. After a couple of years, however, he became disillusioned with the Catholic Church and left. Subsequently, he spent several years in the Chilean Army before returning to his hometown to pursue interests in folk music and theatre.

Musical career
After joining the choir at the University of Chile in Santiago, Jara was convinced by a fellow chorus member to pursue a career in theater. He subsequently joined the university's theater program and, through his talent, earned a scholarship. He appeared in several of the university's plays, gravitating toward those with social themes, such as Russian playwright Maxim Gorky's The Lower Depths.

In 1957, he met Violeta Parra, a singer who had steered folk music in Chile toward modern song composition rooted in traditional forms, and who had established musical community centers called peñas to incorporate folk music into everyday life. Jara absorbed these lessons and began singing with a group called Cuncumén, with whom he continued his explorations of Chile's traditional music. (working as a guitarist and vocalist from 1957 to 1963) He was deeply influenced by the folk music of Chile and other Latin American countries, and by artists such as Parra, Atahualpa Yupanqui, and the poet Pablo Neruda. In the 1960s, Jara started specializing in folk music and sang at Santiago's La Peña de Los Parra, owned by Ángel Parra. Through these activities, he became involved in the Nueva canción movement of Latin American folk music.

In 1966, Víctor released his self-titled first album; it was the only album released by the Demon label and was Víctor Jara's first solo work. The album would later be re-released under the titles Canto a lo humano and Sus mejores canciones, and in 2001 an reissue on CD by Warner Music Chile was released with the original title. This version on CD also included five bonus tracks, four of which are songs by Víctor Jara along with Cuncumén.

The album includes Jara's versions of some Latin American folk songs, such as "La flor que anda de mano en mano", and "Ojitos verdes"; as well as two Chilean folk songs, "La cocinerita"; an Argentinian folk song, or "Ja jai", a Bolivian traditional. The authorship of this album, as well as its singles, was in the hands of Camilo Fernández, owner of the Demon label from its launch in 1966 until 2001, when he transferred the rights to the widow of Víctor Jara.

In 1967 released their second album homonymous, this album apart from the controversial song "The appeared" includes Jara's covers of folk songs from Latin America and Spain. The album was later released under the name of Desde Lonquén hasta siempre. In 1968, Jara released his first collaborative album entitled, "Canciones folklóricas de América" (Folkloric Songs of America), with Quilapayun. In 1970, Jara left theater to devote himself to music.

Political activism
Early in his recording career, Jara showed a knack for antagonizing conservative Chileans, releasing a traditional comic song called "La beata" that depicted a religious woman with a crush on the priest to whom she goes for confession. The song was banned on radio stations and removed from record shops, but the controversy only added to Jara's reputation among young and progressive Chileans. More serious in the eyes of the Chilean right wing was Jara's growing identification with the socialist movement led by Salvador Allende. After visits to Cuba and the Soviet Union in the early 1960s, Jara joined the Communist Party. The personal met the political in his songs about the poverty he had experienced firsthand.

Jara's songs spread outside Chile and were performed by American folk artists. His popularity was due not only to his songwriting skills but also to his exceptional power as a performer. He took a turn toward political confrontation with his 1969 song "Preguntas por Puerto Montt" ("Questions About Puerto Montt"), whose subject was Edmundo Pérez Zujovic, a government official who had ordered police to attack squatters in the town of Puerto Montt. The Chilean political situation deteriorated after the official was assassinated, and right-wing thugs beat up Jara on one occasion.

In 1970, Jara supported Allende, the Popular Unity coalition candidate for president, volunteering for political work and playing free concerts. He composed "Venceremos" ("We Will Triumph"), the theme song of Allende's Popular Unity movement, and welcomed Allende's election to the Chilean presidency in 1970. After the election, Jara continued to speak in support of Allende and played an important role in the new administration's efforts to reorient Chilean culture.

He and his wife, Joan Jara, were key participants in organizing cultural events that supported the Chile's new socialist government. He set poems by Pablo Neruda to music and performed at a ceremony honoring him after Neruda received the Nobel Prize in Literature in 1972. During this time, Jara continued to teach at Chile's Technical University. His popular success during this time, as both a musician and a Communist, earned him a concert in Moscow. He was so successful that the Soviet Union claimed in their media that his vocal prowess was the result of surgery he had undergone while in Moscow.

On 11 September 1973, the Chilean military, with the support of the United States, overthrew the Allende government, resulting in Allende's suicide and the installation of Augusto Pinochet as dictator. On the day of the coup, Jara was on his way to work at the Technical University. He slept that night at the university along with other teachers and students, and sang to raise their morale.

Torture and murder

After the coup, Pinochet's soldiers rounded up Chileans who were believed to be involved with leftist groups, including Allende's Popular Unity party. On the morning of 12 September 1973, Jara was taken prisoner, along with thousands of others, and imprisoned inside Estadio Chile. Soon after, he was killed with a gunshot to the head, and his body was riddled with more than 40 bullets.

According to the BBC:

There are many conflicting accounts of Jara's last days but the 2019 Netflix documentary Massacre at the Stadium pieces together a convincing narrative. As a famous musician and prominent supporter of Allende, Jara was swiftly recognised on his way into the stadium. An army officer threw a lit cigarette on the ground, made Jara crawl for it, then stamped on his wrists. Jara was first separated from the other detainees, then beaten and tortured in the bowels of the stadium. At one point, he defiantly sang "Venceremos (We Will Win)", Allende's 1970 election anthem, through split lips. On the morning of the 16th, according to a fellow detainee, Jara asked for a pen and notebook and scribbled the lyrics to "Estadio Chile", which were later smuggled out of the stadium: "How hard it is to sing when I must sing of horror. / Horror which I am living, horror which I am dying." Two hours later, he was shot dead, then his body was riddled with machine-gun bullets and dumped in the street. He was 40.

After his murder, Jara's body was displayed at the entrance of Chile Stadium for other prisoners to see. It was later discarded outside the stadium along with the bodies of other prisoners who had been killed by the Chilean Army. His body was found by civil servants and brought to a morgue, where one of them was able to identify him and contact his wife, Joan. She took his body and gave him a quick and clandestine burial in the general cemetery before she fled the country into exile.

42 years later, former Chilean military officers were charged with his murder.

Legal actions
On 16 May 2008, retired colonel Mario Manríquez Bravo, who was the chief of security at Chile Stadium as the coup was carried out, was the first to be convicted in Jara's death. Judge Juan Eduardo Fuentes, who oversaw Bravo's conviction, then decided to close the case, a decision Jara's family soon appealed. In June 2008, Judge Fuentes re-opened the investigation and said he would examine 40 new pieces of evidence provided by Jara's family.

On 28 May 2009, José Adolfo Paredes Márquez, a 54-year-old former Army conscript arrested the previous week in San Sebastián, Chile, was formally charged with Jara's murder. Following his arrest, on 1 June 2009, the police investigation identified the officer who had shot Jara in the head. The officer played Russian roulette with Jara by placing a single round in his revolver, spinning the cylinder, placing the muzzle against Jara's head, and pulling the trigger. The officer repeated this a couple of times until a shot fired and Jara fell to the ground. The officer then ordered two conscripts (one of them Paredes) to finish the job by firing into Jara's body. A judge ordered Jara's body to be exhumed in an effort to gather more information about his death.

On 3 December 2009, Jara was reburied after a massive funeral in the Galpón Víctor Jara, across from Santiago's Plaza Brasil.

On 28 December 2012, a judge in Chile ordered the arrest of eight former army officers for alleged involvement in Jara's murder. He issued an international arrest warrant for one of them, Pedro Barrientos Núñez, the man accused of shooting Jara in the head during a torture session.

On 4 September 2013, Chadbourne & Parke attorneys Mark D. Beckett and Christian Urrutia, with the assistance of the Center for Justice and Accountability, filed suit in a United States court against Barrientos, who lives in Florida, on behalf of Jara's widow and children. The suit accused Barrientos of arbitrary detention; cruel, inhuman, or degrading treatment or punishment; extrajudicial killing; and crimes against humanity under the Alien Tort Statute (ATS), and of torture and extrajudicial killing under the Torture Victim Protection Act (TVPA). It alleged that Barrientos was liable for Jara's death as a direct perpetrator and as a commander.

The specific claims were that:
 On 11 September 1973, troops from the Arica Regiment of the Chilean Army, specifically from La Serena, attacked the university where Jara taught. The troops prohibited civilians from entering or leaving the university premises. During the afternoon of 12 September 1973, military personnel entered the university and illegally detained hundreds of professors, students, and administrators. Víctor Jara was among those arbitrarily detained on the campus and was subsequently transferred to Chile Stadium, where he was tortured and killed. 
 In the course of transporting and processing the civilian prisoners, Captain Fernando Polanco Gallardo, a commanding officer in military intelligence, recognized Jara as the well-known folk singer whose songs addressed social inequality, and who had supported President Allende's government. Captain Polanco separated Jara from the group and beat him severely. He then transferred Jara, along with some of the other civilians, to the stadium.
 Throughout his detention in the locker room of the stadium, Jara was in the physical custody of Lieutenant Barrientos, soldiers under his command, or other members of the Chilean Army who acted in accordance with the army's plan to commit human rights abuses against civilians.
 The arbitrary detention, torture, and extrajudicial killing of Jara and other detainees were part of a widespread, systematic attack on civilians by the Chilean Army from 11 to 15 September 1973. Barrientos knew, or should have known, about these attacks, if for no other reason than that he was present for and participated in them.

On 15 April 2015, a US judge ordered Barrientos to stand trial in Florida. On 27 June 2016, he was found liable for Jara's killing, and the jury awarded Jara's family $28 million.

On 3 July 2018, eight retired Chilean military officers were sentenced to 15 years in prison for Jara's murder and the murder of his Communist associate and former Chilean prison director Littre Quiroga Carvajal. They received three extra years for kidnapping both men.  A ninth suspect was sentenced to five years in prison for covering up the murders. 

In November 2018, it was reported that a Chilean court ordered the extradition of Barrientos.

Theater work
 1959. Parecido à la Felicidad (Some Kind of Happiness), Alejandro Sieveking
 1960. La Viuda de Apablaza (The Widow of Apablaza), Germán Luco Cruchaga (assistant director to Pedro de la Barra, founder of ITUCH) 
 1960. The Mandrake, Niccolò Machiavelli
 1961. La Madre de los Conejos (Mother Rabbit), Alejandro Sieveking (assistant director to Agustín Siré)
 1962. Ánimas de Día Claro (Daylight Spirits), Alejandro Sieveking
 1963. The Caucasian Chalk Circle, Bertolt Brecht (assistant director to Atahualpa del Cioppo)
 1963. Los Invasores (The Intruders), Egon Wolff
 1963. Dúo (Duet), Raúl Ruiz
 1963. Parecido à la Felicidad, Alejandro Sieveking (version for Chilean television)
 1965. La Remolienda, Alejandro Sieveking
 1965. The Knack, Ann Jellicoe
 1966. Marat/Sade, Peter Weiss (assistant director to William Oliver) 
 1966. La Casa Vieja (The Old House), Abelardo Estorino
 1967. La Remolienda, Alejandro Sieveking
 1967. La Viuda de Apablaza, Germán Luco Cruchaga (director)
 1968. Entertaining Mr Sloane, Joe Orton
 1969. Viet Rock, Megan Terry
 1969. Antigone, Sophocles
 1972. Directed a ballet and musical homage to Pablo Neruda, which coincided with Neruda's return to Chile after being awarded the Nobel Prize for Literature.

Discography

Studio albums
Víctor Jara (Geografía) (1966)
Víctor Jara (1967)
Canciones folklóricas de América (with Quilapayún) (1967)
Pongo en tus manos abiertas (1969)
Canto libre (1970)
El derecho de vivir en paz (1971)
La Población (1972)
Canto por travesura (1973)
Tiempos que cambian (unfinished) (Estimated release: 1974)
Manifiesto (1974; reissued in 2001)

Live albums
 Víctor Jara en Vivo (1974)
 El Recital (1983)
 Víctor Jara en México (1996)
 Habla y canta (1996; reissued in 2001)
 En Vivo en el Aula Magna de la Universidad de Valparaíso (2003)

Compilations
 Te recuerdo, Amanda (1974)
 Presente (1975)
 Vientos Del Pueblo (1976)
 Canto Libre (1977)
 An unfinished song (1984)
 Todo Víctor Jara (1992)
 20 Años Después (1992)
 The Rough Guide to the Music of the Andes (1996)
 Víctor Jara presente, colección "Haciendo Historia" (1997)
 Te Recuerdo, Víctor (2000)
 Antología Musical (2001)
 1959–1969 – Víctor Jara (2001)
 Latin Essential: Victor Jara (2003)
 Colección Víctor Jara (2004)
 Víctor Jara. Serie de Oro. Grandes Exitos (2005)

Tribute albums
 A Víctor Jara by Raimon (1974)
 Het Recht om in Vrede te Leven by Cornelis Vreeswijk (1978)
 Cornelis sjunger Victor Jara: Rätten till ett eget liv by Cornelis Vreeswijk (1979)
 Konzert für Víctor Jara by various artists (1998)
 Inti-illimani interpeta a Víctor Jara by Inti-Illimani (1999)
 Quilapayún Canta a Violeta Parra, Víctor Jara y Grandes Maestros Populares by Quilapayún (2000)
 Conosci Victor Jara? by Daniele Sepe (2000)
 Tributo Rock a Víctor Jara by various artists  (2001)
 Tributo a Víctor Jara by various artists (2004)
 Lonquen: Tributo a Víctor Jara by Francesca Ancarola (2005)
 Even in Exile by James Dean Bradfield (2020)

Documentaries and films
The following are films or documentaries about and/or featuring Víctor Jara:
 1973: El Tigre Saltó y Mató, Pero Morirá…Morirá…. Director: Santiago Álvarez – Cuba
 1974: Compañero: Víctor Jara of Chile. Directors: Stanley Foreman/Martin Smith (Documentary) – UK
 1976: Il Pleut sur Santiago. Director: Helvio Soto – France/Bulgaria
 1978: Ein April hat 30 Tage. Director: Gunther Scholz – East Germany
 1978: El Cantor. Director: Dean Reed – East Germany
 1999: El Derecho de Vivir en Paz. Director: Carmen Luz Parot – Chile
 2001: Freedom Highway: Songs That Shaped a Century. Director: Philip King – Ireland
 2005: La Tierra de las 1000 Músicas [Episode 6: La Protesta]. Directors: Luis Miguel González Cruz,  – Spain
 2010: Phil Ochs: There but for Fortune Director: Kenneth Bowser
 2019:Masacre en el estadio. Netflix

In popular culture

Jara is one of many desaparecidos (people who vanished under the Pinochet government and were most likely tortured and killed) whose families are still struggling to get justice. Joan Jara currently lives in Chile and runs the Víctor Jara Foundation, which was established on 4 October 1994 with the goal of promoting and continuing Jara's work. She publicized a poem that Jara wrote before his death about the conditions of the prisoners in the stadium. The poem, written on a piece of paper that was hidden inside the shoe of a friend, was never named, but it is commonly known as "Estadio Chile" (Chile Stadium, now known as Víctor Jara Stadium).

On 22 September 1973, the Soviet astronomer Nikolai Stepanovich Chernykh found an asteroid that he initially called "SO2", but later he would end up calling it "2644 Victor Jara".

The 1975 anthology For Neruda, for Chile contains a section called "The Chilean Singer", with poems dedicated to Jara.

Arlo Guthrie wrote a song called "Victor Jara" on his album Amigo released in 1976.

In 1977, Chilean composer Leon Schidlowsky composed the Misa Sine Nomine (Mass Without Name) in memory of Jara, setting parts of the mass ordinary juxtaposed with Biblical passages in Hebrew, and texts in other languages by various contemporary authors, including by the composer himself, for narrator, mixed choirs with up to 36 voices, organ, and percussion.

The song "Washington Bullets" on The Clash's album "Sandinista!" contains the refrain:
"Remember Allende and the days before, 
before the army came.
Please remember Victor Jara, in the Santiago stadium..."

In 1989, Scottish rock band Simple Minds dedicated the song "Street Fighting Years" to Jara.

In the late 1990s, British actress Emma Thompson started to work on a screenplay that she planned to use as the basis for a movie about Jara. Thompson, a human rights activist and fan of Jara, saw his murder as a symbol of human rights violations in Chile, and believed a movie about his life and death would raise awareness. The movie was to feature Antonio Banderas as Jara and Thompson as his wife, Joan. However, the project was not completed. 

In 2007, a fishing schooner built in 1917 in Denmark was renamed after Jara. It sails at social and cultural events, and when not on the high seas is at the museum in the port of Lübeck, Germany.

The 2008 album Carried to Dust by Calexico opens with the song "Victor Jara's Hands".

English folk musician Reg Meuross wrote a song named "Victor Jara" which is included on his 2010 album All This Longing.

The title song on Rory McLeod's album Angry Love is about Jara. 

In a list made by Rolling Stone, published on 3 June 2013, Jara is named as one of the "15 Rock & Roll Rebels", being the only Latin American to make the list.

In 2020, James Dean Bradfield of Manic Street Preachers released a concept album about Jara called Even In Exile.

On 7 September 2021, the Municipality of Estación Central approved the name change of "Avenida Ecuador" to "Avenida Víctor Jara".

See also
 Nueva Canción Chilena
 Estadio Victor Jara
 2644 Victor Jara
 Brigada Victor Jara
 Galpón Víctor Jara

References

Bibliography 
 Jara, Joan (1983). Victor: An Unfinished Song. Jonathan Cape, London. 
 
 Kósichev, Leonard. (1990). La guitarra y el poncho de Víctor Jara. Progress Publishers, Moscow

External links

Resources in English
 Three chapters from Victor: An Unfinished Song by Joan Jara
 Discography
 Victor Jara: The Martyred Musician of Nueva Cancion Chilena 
 Background materials on the Chilean Workers' Movement in the 1970s
 Report of the Chilean National Commission on Truth and Reconciliation
 GDR Poster Art: Víctor Jara
Allende's Poet. Nick MacWilliam for Jacobin, 2 August 2016.

Resources in Spanish
 Fundación Víctor Jara
 Lyrics of all his Songs
 Discography
 Vientos del Pueblo: Un Homenaje a Víctor Jara

1932 births
1973 deaths
Anti-fascists
Anti-capitalists
Assassinated Chilean people
Burials in Chile
Chilean male actors
Chilean educators
Chilean folk singers
Chilean male poets
Chilean male singer-songwriters
Chilean theatre directors
Chilean Christians
Chilean communists
Chilean socialists
Chilean torture victims
Deaths by firearm in Chile
Executed writers
Former Roman Catholics
Latin American folk singers
Marxist humanists
Nueva canción musicians
People from Chillán
University of Chile alumni
Chilean Marxists
People murdered in Chile
Communist Party of Chile politicians
University of Santiago, Chile alumni
Political music artists
20th-century Chilean poets
20th-century Chilean male writers
20th-century Chilean male singers